Andrew George Lehmann (17 February 1922 – 9 July 2006) was a literary critic, academic, and seminal author and essayist in French Symbolism, and the intellectual history of European Romanticism.

Early life
Born in Chile to Mary Grisel Lehmann (née Bissett) and Andrew William Lehmann, a mining engineer, Professor Lehmann was the younger brother of Olga Lehmann and Monica Pidgeon. His father was of German and French descent (born in Paris) and his mother was Scottish. Naturalized a British citizen and educated at Dulwich College, London, and The Queen's College, Oxford, he demonstrated impressive intellectual and athletic capabilities, achieving the status of Junior Fencing Champion for England. In 1942, he married Alastine Mary Bell, by whom he had three children.

Career
He was commissioned in to the 6th Rajputana Rifles of the British Indian Army on the 26 November 1942. He contracted poliomyelitis, which effectively put an end to any athletic ambitions, but did nothing to diminish his intellectual and academic achievements after the war. He relinquished his commission due to ill health and was granted the honorary rank of lieutenant on 19 May 1944.

In addition to his literary output, Lehmann assumed a variety of academic posts at the Universities of Manchester, Reading, worked as a director of Linguaphone, and in 1983 accepted the post of Rank Foundation Professor of European Studies and Dean of Studies at University of Buckingham, which he held until his retirement in 1988.

Other work
He was on the governing body of Abingdon School from 1966-1969.

Further reading
Marquis Who's Who in the World, "Lehmann, Andrew George", N.J.: Marquis Who's Who, 2005.
  Google Books "A. G. Lehmann"

Selected books 
The Symbolist Aesthetic in France, 1885–1895, Oxford: Blackwell, 1950, 1968.
Sainte-Beuve: a portrait of the critic, 1804–1842, Oxford: Clarendon Press, 1962.
The European Heritage: an outline of Western culture, Oxford: Phaidon, 1984. , .

References

1922 births
2006 deaths
English art critics
English literary critics
Academics of the University of Buckingham
Alumni of The Queen's College, Oxford
People educated at Dulwich College
Academics of the Victoria University of Manchester
Academics of the University of Reading
British Indian Army officers
Chilean people of German descent
Chilean people of French descent
Chilean people of Scottish descent
Naturalised citizens of the United Kingdom
English people of Scottish descent
English people of French descent
English people of German descent
Governors of Abingdon School
Chilean emigrants to the United Kingdom